Maddington may refer to

Maddington, Wiltshire, England, a former civil parish now part of the parish of Shrewton
Maddington, Western Australia, a suburb in Australia
Maddington, Quebec, a canton of Quebec in Canada